Mungana is part of the rural locality of Chillagoe, north Queensland, Australia and a former mining township in its own right. It is within the local government area of Shire of Mareeba (between 2008 and 2013, it was within the Tablelands Region).

History
Mungana Post Office opened by 1907 (a receiving office had been open in 1897 and 1898), closed in 1945, reopened in 1951 and closed again in 1960.

It was once the site of copper mines that featured in the Mungana Affair.

Heritage listings
Mungana has a number of heritage-listed sites, including the Mungana Archaeological Area.

References

External links

 University of Queensland: Queensland Places: Mungana

Far North Queensland
Towns in Queensland
Shire of Mareeba